Taroom Airport  is an airport located  southeast of Taroom, Queensland, Australia.

The airport is served by 4-6 weekly weekday charter services to Brisbane and Chinchilla operated by Skytrans Airlines using their Dash-8-100 aircraft. These charters are operated on behalf of QGC.

See also
 List of airports in Queensland

References

Airports in Queensland